This is a list of notable wireless, wireline, direct-to-home (DTH) and R&D firms/operators in India.

Wireless operators 
As of 31 December 2022, there are 114.2 crore (1.14 billion) wireless subscribers in India (including inactive users) according to Telecom Regulatory Authority of India (TRAI).

Mobile operators
Over the past decade, the Indian cellular services market has seen rapid consolidation. The launch of Reliance Jio in 2016 changed the market dynamics substantially as the company offered free data and voice services during its first year of operations, prompting a fierce price war in the market. Jio managed to garner over 10 crore (100 million) subscribers in its first 6 months of operations. 

As a result, the number of operators in the Indian cellular market have substantially reduced over the past decade. At its peak, the market had as many as 12 active mobile operators.

In 2018, Bharti Airtel lost its market leadership position for the first time in 15 years as a result of the completion of a merger between then telecom giants Vodafone India and Idea Cellular.

Active operators 
As of December 2022, there are 5 active mobile operators in the country, namely Bharti Airtel, BSNL, MTNL, Reliance Jio and Vodafone Idea. 

MTNL, having started operations in 1986 remains the oldest active operator whereas Bharti Airtel, which started its services in 1995, is the oldest active private operator.

Defunct operators 
As of 31 December 2023, 16 mobile operators have ceased operations in India. The longest operating defunct operator is Aircel, while the oldest is Modi-Telstra - which was also the first mobile operator in the country. Most recently, Reliance Communications ceased operations citing bankruptcy.

Direct-to-home (DTH) operators

There are 4 pay-for-use DTH service providers and one free-to-air service provider (DD Free Dish) in India.

As of 30 September 2022, there are 6.558 crore (65.58 million) active paying DTH subscribers, in addition to the subscribers of state-owned DD Free Dish, in the country according to Telecom Regulatory Authority of India (TRAI). DD Free Dish has over 4 crore (40 million) subscribers.

Notes
 DD free dish is Free To air Service hence their subscriber data is not shown in TRAI performance report.
 On 22 March 2018, Dish TV merged with d2h, creating the then largest DTH provider in India.

Wireline operators

Fixed-line operators
As of 31 October 2022, there are 2.682 crore (26.82 million) wireline subscribers in India according to Telecom Regulatory Authority of India (TRAI).

Multiple-system operators (MSOs)

As of 31 December 2021, there are 1753 MSOs (some also have an ISP license).

List of top MSOs by subscribers

Internet service providers (ISPs) 
As of 31 October 2022, there were 874 internet service providers (ISPs) offering broadband (wired + wireless) services; the top 5 services constituted 98.40% market share of the total broadband subscribers according to TRAI. These service providers were :

The following table shows the top 5 wired broadband service providers in India by total subscriber base as of 31 October 2022.

The following table shows the top 5 wireless broadband service providers in India by total subscriber base as of 31 October 2022. 

Notes

 Broadband: Internet access with a minimum capacity of greater or equal 512 Kbit/s in one or both directions.
 Narrowband: Internet access with a capacity of less than 512 Kbit/s in one or both directions.

Other notable ISPs

For enterprise/wholesale only

Telecom R&D firms

See also 
 Telecommunications in India
 List of mobile network operators
 Direct-to-home television in India
 List of mobile network operators of the Asia Pacific region
 Internet in India

Notes

References

External links
 ISP market share grouped by ASNs used (APNIC report)
 List of ASNs assigned to India
 DoT website
 List of Telecom Service Providers on TRAI website
 Department of Telecommunications, Government of India
 Telecom Regulatory Authority of India
 Cellular Operators Association of India
 Wireless Planning & Coordination Wing
 List of Telecom Service Providers on TRAI website
 Live Video Streaming Services

 
Telecom
Telecommunications companies of India
India telecom